Ethylone, also known as 3,4-methylenedioxy-N-ethylcathinone (MDEC, βk-MDEA), is a recreational designer drug classified as an entactogen, stimulant, and psychedelic of the phenethylamine, amphetamine, and cathinone chemical classes. It is the β-keto analogue of MDEA ("Eve"). Ethylone has only a short history of human use and is reported to be less potent than its relative methylone. In the United States, it began to be found in cathinone products in late 2011.

Very little data exists about the pharmacological properties, metabolism, and toxicity of ethylone, and although several ethylone-related deaths have been reported, the cause of death was not due to ingestion of ethylone.

Pharmacokinetics
Analysis of human and rat urine for the metabolites of bk-amphetamines suggested that ethylone was degraded in the following metabolic steps: 
 N-deethylation to the primary amine.
 Reduction of the keto moiety to the respective alcohol.

Legal Status

As of October 2015 Ethylone is a controlled substance in China.

See also 
 5-Methylethylone
 Benzylone

References

External links 
 Erowid bk-MDEA Vault
 Erowid bk-MDEA Experiences

Cathinones
Psychedelic phenethylamines
Entactogens and empathogens
Benzodioxoles
Designer drugs
Serotonin-norepinephrine-dopamine releasing agents
Substituted amphetamines